The 2009 UNAF U-20 Tournament was the 5th edition of the UNAF U-20 Tournament. The tournament took place in Libya, from 5 to 9 August 2009. Tunisia won the tournament for the third time.

Participants

 (hosts)

Venues

Tournament

Matches

Champion

References

2009 in African football
UNAF U-20 Tournament
UNAF U-20 Tournament